The Rossi Model 461 is a revolver manufactured by the Rossi Firearms company.

Description
The 461 is offered in calibers.357 Magnum and .38 Special +P  only. The revolver is double action and it fires six rounds per load. It weighs twenty six ounces. It is six and a half inches long. It is made of steel and its finish is blued. The 461's sights are fixed gutter revolver sights.

There is a known issue with the 461 model, in that the firing pin can break off if the revolver is dry fired. However, replacement parts are available, albeit not directly sold by Rossi manufacturers themselves.

Variants
Along with the 461 Rossi also produces the Model 462. This is a polished stainless steel version of the 461. Both revolvers have a 2-inch barrel, a rubberized finger groove grip and fixed sights. The 461 and 462 are both produced in Brazil by Taurus Firearms Ltd. under license from Rossi USA.

Both the model 461 and 462 are certified for use with .38 Special +P rounds, and have a limited lifetime warranty through Rossi USA.

See also
 Rossi R97206

References 

Rossi Firearms
Revolvers of Brazil